Blue Bolt is a  fictional American comic book superhero created by writer-artist Joe Simon in 1940, during the period fans and historians refer to as the Golden Age of Comic Books.

Publication history
Initially published by Novelty Press, Blue Bolt Comics, one of the earliest comic books titled after a single character, ran 101 issues, cover-dated June 1940 to August 1951. Its namesake hero was created by writer-artist Joe Simon for Funnies Inc., one of the earliest comic-book "packagers" that produced outsourced comics on demand for publishers entering the fledgling medium. By the second issue, Simon had enlisted Jack Kirby as the series co-writer/artist, starting the first pairing of the future comic book legends who shortly thereafter created Captain America and other characters. As Simon recalled in a 1998 Comic-Con International panel in San Diego, California:

The two teamed until issue #10, turning over the book to successors including Dan Barry, Tom Gill, and Mickey Spillane (before Spillane's creation of the detective character Mike Hammer in novels).

Other enduring features in Blue Bolt included Dick Cole, The Wonder Boy, Sub-Zero Man, Sgt. Spook, Old Cap Hawkin's Tales, White Rider and Super Horse, Edison Bell, Runaway Ronson, Phantom Sub, Krisko and Jasper, Fearless Fellers, and Rick Richards.

As the popularity of superheroes began to fade in the post-World War II era, the character of Blue Bolt was transformed from a superhero into a plainclothes type of hero.

In 1949, Novelty Press sold its assets, including Blue Bolt, to series cover artist L. B. Cole due to the growing criticism over violence in comic books. Using his new assets, Cole began his own company, Star Publications.

Transition to horror title 
By 1951, Blue Bolt Comics''' name had been changed to Blue Bolt Weird Tales of Terror and featured the type of horror covers epitomized by EC Comics. A couple of issues after the name change, the Blue Bolt was dropped in favor of horror stories. With issue #120 (published in 1953) the title was changed to Ghostly Weird Stories, which published four more issues under that title before folding after issue #124 (September 1954).

Fictional character biography
After college football star Fred Parrish is struck by lightning during practice he boards a plane in order to seek help. This plane is struck by a second lightning bolt, causing the plane to crash. Finding himself underground, Parrish is found by a scientist named Bertoff who heals him using an experimental radium treatment. This treatment gives Parrish super powers. Using his powers and a lightning gun given to him by Bertoff, Parrish takes up the name the Blue Bolt and battles the underground forces of his arch-enemy, the evil Green Sorceress. 

After a year, the Blue Bolt discovers that World War II has started. He journeys back to the surface to fight against the Nazis.

After the war, Blue Bolt becomes a pilot for Glimpses'', the picture magazine, and works with daring photographer Snap Doodle.

Powers and abilities
After being struck by lightning twice and being healed via an experimental treatment, Fred Parrish gained the ability to project lightning bolts. He also possessed a lightning gun which could shoot lightning bolts.

References

External links
Grand Comics Database Project: Blue Bolt Comics
Grand Comics Database Project: Blue Bolt Weird Tales of Terror
A Simon&Kirby Blue Bolt story

Comics characters introduced in 1940
Characters created by Joe Simon
Golden Age superheroes
Novelty Press